This is a list of industrial sites on or adjacent to the foreshore of Port Jackson, including Sydney Harbour,  North Harbour, Middle Harbour, Lane Cove River, Parramatta River, and the islands within those waterways. Sydney now has relatively few foreshore industrial sites compared with earlier times, and this list is mainly of historical interest.

This list may not include all existing and former industrial sites on or near the foreshore. It covers the period commencing from colonisation of Sydney  in 1788.

The Parramatta River, although for the most part tidal, is defined as commencing at a line between Mann's Point, Greenwich and Long Nose Point, Birchgrove.

Northern foreshore 
Sites are shown in order of location on the northern foreshore, running generally east to west.

Southern foreshore
Sites are shown in order of location, generally running generally east to west.

Islands and former islands
Islands and former islands are shown in order, from east to west. There were originally fourteen islands in Port Jackson, including the Parramatta River. In addition to the twelve islands shown below, there were once two much smaller ones, Bennelong Island and another small island that was connected to the former Dawes Island to form the island now known as Spectacle Island.  During the construction of the Fort Macquarie, from 1817 to 1821, the former Bennelong Island was joined to the mainland (Bennelong Point), using material excavated when creating the level area occupied by the fort.

Garden Island, Glebe Island and Berry Island, although now linked to the mainland by reclaimed land, are still known by their original names.

Darling Island is no longer an island and is rarely called by that name; it is now part of the north-eastern part of the Pyrmont peninsula.

Reference section

External links

 National Film and Sound Archive: 'Steam on the Harbour' - shows some of the sites listed in this article
 Ship and Boat Builders of Sydney - Mori Flapan

Former buildings and structures in Sydney
Sydney Harbour